Erastus Kihara Mureithi is a Kenyan politician. He belongs to the Party of National Unity and was elected to represent the Ol Kalou Constituency in the National Assembly of Kenya since the 2007 Kenyan parliamentary election.

He vied in 2013 and 2017 and lost both elections.

References

Living people
Year of birth missing (living people)
Party of National Unity (Kenya) politicians
Members of the National Assembly (Kenya)